Braidwood was an electoral district of the Legislative Assembly in the Australian state of New South Wales, one of 62 new districts created established under the Electoral Act 1858 (NSW), in the 1858 redistribution. Braidwood was named after and included the town of Braidwood. It replaced parts of the districts of United Counties of Murray and St Vincent and the Southern Boroughs. In 1904 it was largely absorbed into the district of Queanbeyan. The balance of the district went to the new district of The Clyde.

Members for Braidwood

Election results

References

Former electoral districts of New South Wales
Constituencies established in 1859
Constituencies disestablished in 1904
1859 establishments in Australia
1904 disestablishments in Australia